Songs and Stories  is a studio album by George Benson. The album was released by Concord on August 25, 2009. The album was produced by John Burk and Marcus Miller and featured a host of guest musicians.

Track listing

Personnel 
 George Benson – vocals (1-12), guitar (1, 3-13), guitar solo (2)
 Toninho Horta – acoustic guitar (1, 12)
 Paul Jackson Jr. – guitar (2, 3)
 John "Jubu" Smith – guitar (2-5, 7-11)
 Steve Lukather – guitar (3)
 Norman Brown – guitar (6), vocals (6)
 Wah Wah Watson – guitar (8, 11)
 Lee Ritenour – acoustic guitar (10), electric guitar (10)
 Marcelo Lima – acoustic guitar (12)
 Bruno Cardozo – Hammond B3 organ (1), keyboards (12)
 William Magalhães – Fender Rhodes (1, 12)
 Greg Phillinganes – keyboards (2, 4, 5, 8), acoustic piano (3, 11), Fender Rhodes (6, 7, 9)
 Rod Temperton – keyboards (2), arrangements (2)
 David Paich – keyboards (3), string and horn arrangements (3)
 Steve Porcaro – synthesizers (3)
 Bobby Sparks – Hammond B3 organ (4, 6, 7, 9, 13), keyboards (6)
 David Garfield – keyboards (10), backing vocals (10)
 Robbie Benson – keyboards (13)
 Marcus Miller – bass (1-11, 13), keyboards (2, 13), marimba (2), string arrangements (2, 10, 11), horn arrangements (4, 11), drum loop programming (6), arrangements (6, 7), percussion (7), vocals (7), percussion programming (10, 13), vibraphone (11)
 Arthur Maia – fretless bass (12)
 John Robinson – drums (2-11, 13)
 Maguinho Alcântara – drums (12)
 Paulinho da Costa – percussion (1, 2, 4, 5, 7, 8, 10)
 Butterscotch – human beatbox (1)
 Noël Lee – wind chimes (12)
 Victor Vanacore – string arrangements (1, 4, 5, 9), horn arrangements (4)
 Jerry Hey – horn arrangements (3)
 Tom Scott – saxophone (3, 4, 7, 11), horn arrangements (7)
 Gerald Albright – saxophone (4)
 Charles Loper – trombone (3, 4, 7, 11)
 Chuck Findley – trumpet (3, 4, 7, 11)
 Gary Grant – trumpet (3, 4, 7, 11)
 John Hayhurst – viola (1-5, 9, 11)
 Michael Molnau – viola (1-5, 9, 11)
 Robin Ross – viola (1-5, 9, 11)
 Evan Wilson – viola (1-5, 9, 11)
 Sai Ly Acosta – violin (1-5, 9, 11)
 Susan Chatman – violin (1-5, 9, 11)
 Ronald Clark – violin (1-5, 9, 11)
 Joel Derouin – violin (1-5, 9, 11)
 Charles Everett – violin (1-5, 9, 11)
 Gerry Hilera – violin (1-5, 9, 11)
 Victoria Lanier – violin (1-5, 9, 11)
 Dennis Molchan – violin (1-5, 9, 11)
 Xiao Niu He – violin (1-5, 9, 11)
 Todor Pelev – violin (1-5, 9, 11)
 Kathleen Robertson – violin (1-5, 9, 11)
 Patti Austin – backing vocals (2, 4), vocals (8)
 Carolyn Perry – backing vocals (2, 4)
 Lori Perry – backing vocals (2, 4)
 Sharon Perry – backing vocals (2, 4)
 Lalah Hathaway – vocals (4)
 Smokey Robinson – backing vocals (10)
 J. J. Blair – backing vocals (10)
 Leslie Smith – backing vocals (10)

Production 
 Producer – Marcus Miller and John Burk
 Associate Producers on Track 1 – Toninho Horta, Michael O'Neill and Forest Sprague.
 Co-Producers on Track 3 – Steve Lukather and David Paich
 Executive Producers – John Burk and Noël Lee 
 Engineers – Don Murray, J. J. Blair, Guilherme Canaes, Jeff Harris, Taka Honda, Stefan Nordin, Seth Presant, John Wroble and Noel Zancanella.
 Assistant Engineers – Steve Cohen, Martin Cooke, Tom Syrowski and Aaron Walk.
 Recorded at Henson Recording Studios and Capitol Studios (Hollywood, CA); The Village Recorder, ATS Studios and Fox Force Five Studios (Los Angeles, CA); Hannibal Studio (Santa Monica, CA); Porcupine Studio (Chandler, AZ); Mega Studios (Sao Paulo, Brazil).
 Mixed by Don Murray at G Studio Digital (Studio City, CA).
 Mastered by Doug Sax and Sangwook "Sunny" Nam at The Mastering Lab (Ojai, CA).
 Art Direction and Design – Greg Allen and Larissa Collins
 Photography – Greg Allen

References 
Allmusic 
Discogs 
Barnes & Noble

George Benson albums
2009 albums
Albums produced by Marcus Miller
Concord Records albums
Albums recorded at A&M Studios
Albums recorded at Capitol Studios